Vietnam has qualified to the FIFA Women's World Cup in one occasion, the 2023 FIFA Women's World Cup which will also be the country's debut.

Although Vietnam has been well-established in women's football among Asia's middle forces, it has missed out the golden chance during the 2014 AFC Women's Asian Cup at home, losing to Thailand 1–2 (which also helped Thailand to debut in the Women's World Cup). After that missed opportunity, Vietnam entered its second playoff campaign in the 2022 AFC Women's Asian Cup playoffs, again grouped with Thailand and Chinese Taipei; this time, Vietnam triumphed in the playoffs to finally book a place in Australia/New Zealand 2023 edition, for the first time ever.

Australia/New Zealand 2023 

After the draw results on 22 October 2022, the Vietnamese women's team again fell into the "super death" group, as the United States are the defending champion of the previous tournament and the Netherlands are the runner-up, leading to the high possibility of being eliminated from the group stage. Both teams against Vietnam have never met each other, the rest is the group A play-off winner (Cameroon, Thailand or Portugal), to be determined at the end of February 2023.

Group stage (Group E)

FIFA Women's World Cup record

References

 
World Cup
Countries at the FIFA Women's World Cup